Karmi is a village in Cyprus, located west of Kyrenia. De facto, it is under the control of Northern Cyprus. Its population in 2011 was 55.

References

Communities in Kyrenia District
Populated places in Girne District
Greek Cypriot villages depopulated during the 1974 Turkish invasion of Cyprus